This list contains all cultural property of regional significance (class B) in the canton of Valais from the 2009 Swiss Inventory of Cultural Property of National and Regional Significance. It is sorted by municipality.

Albinen

Ardon

Ausserberg

Ayent

Bagnes

Baltschieder

Bellwald

Binn

Blatten

Bourg-Saint-Pierre

Brig-Glis

Chalais

Chamoson

Chippis

Collombey-Muraz

Collonges

Conthey

Ernen

Ferden

Fiesch

Fieschertal

Finhaut

Fully

Grafschaft

Grengiols

Grimisuat

Kippel

Lax

Lens

Les Agettes

Leuk

Leukerbad

Leytron

Liddes

Martigny

Massongex

Monthey

Naters

Nendaz

Niedergesteln

Niederwald

Oberems

Port-Valais

Randa

Randogne

Raron

Reckingen-Gluringen

Riddes

Riederalp

Saas-Balen

Saas-Fee

Saas-Grund

Saillon

Saint-Gingolph

Saint-Maurice

Salgesch

Salvan

Saxon

Sembrancher

Sierre

Simplon

Sion

Staldenried

Trient

Troistorrents

Vernayaz

Vex

Veyras

Vionnaz

Visp

Visperterminen

Vouvry

Zeneggen

Zermatt

Zwischbergen

See also 
List of cultural property of national significance in Switzerland: Valais

References 
 Swiss Inventory of Cultural Property of National and Regional Significance, 2009 edition:
PDF documents: Class A objects
PDF documents: Class B objects